Springfield Park may refer to:
Springfield Park, Liverpool, a public park in Liverpool, England
Springfield Park (London), a park in Upper Clapton, London
Springfield Park (Durban), an industrial suburb of Durban, South Africa
Springfield Park, Quebec, a neighbourhood in Longueuil, Quebec, Canada
Springfield Park (Queens), a city park in Queens, of New York City
Springfield Park (Rochdale), a public park in Rochdale, England
Springfield Park (Wigan), a former multi-use stadium in Wigan, England